Devon Harris,  (born 1964) is a Jamaican retired bobsledder and military officer. He was one of the founding members of the Jamaica national bobsled team, which first competed in the 1988 Winter Olympics in Calgary, Alberta.  Nicknamed "Pele" after the famous football star, Harris went on to compete in the 1992 Winter Olympics and the 1998 Winter Olympics.

Harris grew up in the Kingston ghetto of Sunrise Drive in Olympic Gardens (known as "Waterhouse," or "Firehouse," because it was a volatile area). A graduate of Drews Ave Secondary School, Ardenne High School, and Royal Military Academy Sandhurst, Harris had been an avid football player and track and field participant, with his dream being to represent Jamaica in the 1984 Summer Olympics in the 800m and 1500m events.  Since the idea for a Jamaican Bobsled Team was pitched to the Jamaica Defence Force, Harris, as a lieutenant in the Second Battalion, first came across the proposal in a weekly army publication called "Force Orders" in September 1987.  The text had called for those who wished to "undergo rigorous and dangerous training" to represent Jamaica in the Winter Olympics.  Harris initially thought the idea was ridiculous, but was eventually convinced to participate by his colonel, Lt. Col Alan Douglas.  At the team selections, Harris ended up with the fastest push time.

Harris returned to the military after Calgary and later became a civilian in 1992 after his second Olympics in Albertville, France. He  also competed in the 1998 Olympics in Nagano, Japan. He now works as a motivational public speaker and writer.

Harris wrote the 2008 children's book, Yes, I can! : the story of the Jamaican bobsled team, illustrated by Ricardo Cortes and in 2010 published his semi-autobiographical motivational book; Keep On Pushing: Hot Lessons From Cool Runnings

In 2006, Harris founded the Keep On Pushing Foundation which supports the education of kids in disadvantaged communities

During the 2018 Olympic Games in PyeongChang, Devon was honored by the World Olympians Association and inducted as an Olympian For Life in recognition of the significant contribution he has made to society in inspiring other never to give up.

References

External links
Motivational speaker, three time Olympian
Interview with Devon Harris, Member of Original Bobsled Team (February 1, 2005)
 Devon Harris' interview with John Kline of Elevation Radio (February 23, 2010)

1964 births
Living people
Jamaican male bobsledders
Bobsledders at the 1988 Winter Olympics
Bobsledders at the 1992 Winter Olympics
Bobsledders at the 1998 Winter Olympics
Jamaican motivational speakers
Jamaican military officers
Olympic bobsledders of Jamaica
Jamaican expatriates in the United Kingdom